Hennadiy Hanyev (born 15 May 1990) is a Ukrainian professional footballer who plays as a goalkeeper for Bulgarian First League club CSKA 1948.

Career
He is the product of Youth Sportive School in his native village Zorya and FC Chornomorets Odesa. His first trainers were Vasyl Zlatov and Anton Kucherevskyi. From summer 2012 he played for FC Stal Alchevsk. In June 2022, Hanyev joined  CSKA 1948 Sofia.

Personal life
Hanyev is of Bessarabian Bulgarian descent.

References

External links 

1990 births
Living people
People from Sarata
Ukrainian footballers
Association football goalkeepers
FC Chornomorets Odesa players
FC Chornomorets-2 Odesa players
FC Nyva Vinnytsia players
FC Stal Alchevsk players
FC Hirnyk Kryvyi Rih players
FC Zirka Kropyvnytskyi players
FC Inhulets Petrove players
FC Vereya players
FC Dunav Ruse players
PFC Beroe Stara Zagora players
FC CSKA 1948 Sofia players
Ukrainian people of Bulgarian descent
Ukrainian expatriate footballers
Expatriate footballers in Bulgaria
Ukrainian expatriate sportspeople in Bulgaria
Ukrainian Premier League players
Ukrainian First League players
Ukrainian Second League players
First Professional Football League (Bulgaria) players
Sportspeople from Odesa Oblast